"Twins" is a song by Philip Bailey & Little Richard released as a single in 1988 by Epic Records. The song reached No. 16 on the Dutch Pop Singles chart and No. 36 on the Belgian Pop Singles chart.

Overview
Twins was produced by Rhett Lawrence and composed by Skip Scarborough with Lorrin Bates. The song also came off the soundtrack to the 1988 feature film Twins.

Accolades
"Twins" was nominated for a Golden Globe in the category of Best Original Song.

Credits
Backing Vocals – Alexandra Brown, Marlena Jeter, Maxi Anderson, Philip Bailey
Electric Guitar, Lead Guitar, Soloist – Michael Landau
Engineer – Jeffrey 'Woody' Woodruff
Keyboards [Additional] – Jeff Lorber
Keyboards, Drum Programming, Bass [Moog], Synthesizer [Fairlight], Programmed By – Rhett Lawrence
Producer – Rhett Lawrence
Producer [Additional], Mixed By – Keith Cohen, Steve Beltran
Producer [Assisted By] – Liz Cluse
Written-By – Lorrin "Smokey" Bates, Skip Scarborough

References

1988 songs
1988 singles
Epic Records singles
Philip Bailey songs
Little Richard songs
Songs written by Skip Scarborough